Richard Henry Fowler was an English rugby union footballer who played in the 1870s. He played at representative level for England, and at club level for Leeds, and Yorkshire Wanderers, as a forward, e.g. front row, lock, or back row. Prior to Tuesday 27 August 1895, Leeds was a rugby union club.

Playing career

International honours
Henry Fowler won a cap for England while at Leeds in the 1876–77 Home Nations rugby union match against Ireland.

Change of Code
When Leeds converted from the rugby union code to the rugby league code on Tuesday 27 August, Henry Fowler would have likely been in his thirties. Consequently, he may have been both a rugby union and rugby league footballer for Leeds.

References

External links
Search for "Fowler" at rugbyleagueproject.org
Football; the Rugby union game
Search for "Henry Fowler" at britishnewspaperarchive.co.uk
Search for "Richard Henry Fowler" at britishnewspaperarchive.co.uk
Search for "Richard Fowler" at britishnewspaperarchive.co.uk

England international rugby union players
English rugby union players
Leeds Rhinos players
Place of birth missing
Place of death missing
Rugby union forwards
Year of birth missing
Year of death missing
Yorkshire Wanderers players